Peppermint Candy usually refers to Mint (candy).
It may also refer to 
Peppermint Candy (film)